The Fear Fighter is a 1925 American silent comedy film directed by Albert S. Rogell and starring Billy Sullivan, Ruth Dwyer and J.P. McGowan.

Cast
 Billy Sullivan as Billy Griffin 
 Ruth Dwyer as Catherine Curtis 
 J.P. McGowan as James Curtis 
 Gunboat Smith as Prison Inmate 
 Phil Salvadore 
 W.C. Robinson
 Jack Herrick
 Billy Franey

References

Bibliography
 Munden, Kenneth White. The American Film Institute Catalog of Motion Pictures Produced in the United States, Part 1. University of California Press, 1997.

External links
 

1925 films
1926 comedy films
1926 films
1920s English-language films
American silent feature films
Silent American comedy films
American black-and-white films
Films directed by Albert S. Rogell
Rayart Pictures films
1925 comedy films
1920s American films